This is a list of player transfers involving Aviva Premiership teams before or during the 2014–15 season.

Bath

Players In
 Henry Thomas from  Sale Sharks
 Nick Auterac from  Saracens
 Sam Burgess from  South Sydney Rabbitohs
 Luke Arscott from  Exeter Chiefs
 Grant Shiells from  Newcastle Falcons
 Will Spencer promoted from Academy

Players Out
 Anthony Perenise to  Bristol Rugby
 Nick Abendanon to  Clermont Auvergne
 Nick Köster to  Bristol Rugby
 Charlie Beech to  Yorkshire Carnegie
 Tom Biggs to  Worcester Warriors
 Ryan Caldwell to  Exeter Chiefs
 Tom Heathcote to  Edinburgh Rugby
 Martin Roberts to  Ospreys
 Eusebio Guiñazú to  Munster
 Josh Ovens to  Bristol Rugby
 Matt Gilbert to  Worcester Warriors

Exeter Chiefs

Players In
 Thomas Waldrom from  Leicester Tigers
 Moray Low from  Glasgow Warriors
 Tomas Francis from  London Scottish
 Mitch Lees from  London Welsh
 Elvis Taione from  Jersey
 Ryan Caldwell from  Bath Rugby
 Adam Hughes from  Bristol Rugby
 Chrysander Botha from  Lions

Players Out
 Hoani Tui to  Lyon
 Craig Mitchell to  Cardiff Blues
 Romana Graham to  La Rochelle
 Jason Shoemark to  Hawke's Bay Magpies
 Chris Whitehead retired
 Tom Cowan-Dickie to  Plymouth Albion
 James Hanks retired
 Lloyd Fairbrother to  Newport Gwent Dragons
 Luke Arscott to  Bath Rugby
 James Phillips to  London Scottish

Gloucester

Players In
 John Afoa from  Ulster
 Richard Hibbard from  Ospreys
 Mariano Galarza from  Worcester Warriors
 Greig Laidlaw from  Edinburgh Rugby
 Aled Thomas from  Scarlets
 Mark Atkinson from  Bedford Blues
 Tom Isaacs from  Ospreys
 Steve McColl from  Yorkshire Carnegie
 Tom Palmer from  Wasps
 Jacob Rowan from  Yorkshire Carnegie
 James Hook from  USA Perpignan
 Callum Braley from  Bristol Rugby
 Henry Purdy from  Leicester Tigers
 Elliott Stooke promoted from Academy
 Billy Burns promoted from Academy
 Ross Moriarty promoted from Academy
 Aleki Lutui from  Edinburgh Rugby

Players Out
 Will James retired
 Matt Cox to  Worcester Warriors
 Ryan Mills to  Worcester Warriors
 Andy Hazell retired
 Tavis Knoyle to  Cardiff Blues
 Tim Taylor retired
 Dan George to  Worcester Warriors
 Tom Heard to  Plymouth Albion
 Thomas Young to  Wasps
 Freddie Burns to  Leicester Tigers
 Huia Edmonds to  RC Narbonne
 Jonny Bentley to  Jersey
 Rupert Harden to  Benetton Treviso
 Koree Britton to  London Welsh
 Drew Cheshire to  Moseley
 Jimmy Cowan to  Tasman Makos
 Mike Tindall retired
 Andrew Bulumakau to  Doncaster Knights
 Lua Lokotui to  Beziers
 James Simpson-Daniel retired
 Martyn Thomas to  RC Massy

Harlequins

Players In
 Jack Clifford promoted from Academy
 George Merrick promoted from Academy
 Sam Stuart promoted from Academy
 Sam Twomey promoted from Academy
 Charlie Walker promoted from Academy
 Marland Yarde from  London Irish
 Asaeli Tikoirotuma from  Chiefs

Players Out
 Tom Guest to  London Irish
 Sam Smith to  Worcester Warriors
 Maurie Fa'asavalu to  Oyonnax
 Nick Kennedy retired
 Tim Molenaar to  London Welsh
 Nic Mayhew to  North Harbour
 Paul Sackey retired

Leicester Tigers

Players In
 Freddie Burns from  Gloucester Rugby
 Laurence Pearce from  Rotherham Titans
 Christian Loamanu from  Benetton Treviso
 Leonardo Ghiraldini from  Benetton Treviso
 Robert Barbieri from  Benetton Treviso
 Seremaia Bai from  Castres Olympique
 Michele Rizzo from  Benetton Treviso
 Aniseko Sio unattached
 Riccardo Brugnara promoted from Academy
 Tiziano Pasquali promoted from Academy
 Javiah Pohe promoted from Academy
 Tom Price promoted from Academy
 Harry Thacker promoted from Academy
 Brad Thorn from  Highlanders
 Jack Roberts from  Rotherham Titans

Players Out
 Thomas Waldrom to  Exeter Chiefs
 Boris Stankovich to  Newport Gwent Dragons
 Ryan Lamb to  Worcester Warriors
 Toby Flood to  Toulouse
 Scott Steele to  London Irish
 George Chuter retired
 Rob Hawkins to  Newcastle Falcons
 Harry Wells to  Bedford Blues
 Ryan Bower to  Worcester Warriors
 Joe Cain retired
 Jérôme Schuster to  Tarbes
 Pasqualle Dunn released
 Daniel Bowden to  Blues
 Henry Purdy to  Gloucester Rugby
 Lucas Guillaume to  Aix-en-Provence
 Michael Noone to  Jersey
 Steve Mafi to  Western Force
 Harry Rudkin to  Doncaster

London Irish

Players In
 Tom Court from  Ulster
 Tom Guest from  Harlequins
 Eoin Griffin from  Connacht
 Luke Narraway from  USA Perpignan
 James Short from  Saracens
 Geoff Cross from  Edinburgh Rugby
 Sean Cox from  Edinburgh Rugby
 Daniel Leo from  USA Perpignan
 Scott Steele from  Leicester Tigers
 Conor Gilsenan from  Leinster
 Chris Noakes from  Blues

Players Out
 Marland Yarde to  Harlequins
 James O'Connor to  Toulon
 Declan Danaher retired
 Ian Gough to  Newport Gwent Dragons
 Ian Humphreys to  Ulster
 CJ van der Linde to 
 Setaimata Sa to  Hull F.C.
 Bryn Evans to  Biarritz Olympique
 Chris Hala'ufia to  Scarlets
 Ed Hoadley to  London Welsh
 Sailosi Tagicakibau to  Wasps
 Charlie Davey to  Cornish Pirates
 Jon Fisher to  Northampton Saints

London Welsh

Players In
 Olly Barkley from  Scarlets
 Tristan Roberts from  Bristol Rugby
 Nic Reynolds from  Scarlets
 Chris Elder from  Plymouth Albion
 Taione Vea from  Wasps
 Ricky Reeves from  Wasps
 Shane Cahill from  Cornish Pirates
 Jack Gilding from  Viadana
 Jimmy Litchfield from  Hartpury College R.F.C.
 Nathan Taylor from  Hartpury College R.F.C.
 James Sandford from  Cornish Pirates
 Paul Rowley from  Plymouth Albion
 Jesse Liston from  Blackheath
 Josh McNally from  Henley Hawks
 Koree Britton from  Gloucester Rugby
 Tim Molenaar from  Harlequins
 Darren Waters from  Newport Gwent Dragons
 Dean Schofield from  Worcester Warriors
 Lachlan McCaffrey from  Brumbies
 Pablo Henn from  Limoges
 Piri Weepu from  Blues
 Eddie Aholelei from  Melbourne Rebels
 Ed Hoadley from  London Irish
 James Down from  Cardiff Blues
 Ben Cooper from  Bedford Blues

Players Out
 Andy Titterrell retired
 Mitch Lees to  Exeter Chiefs
 Billy Moss to  Bedford Blues
 Peter Edwards to  Scarlets
 Kevin Davis to  Ealing Trailfinders
 Tai Tuisamoa to  London Scottish
 Cai Griffiths to  Ospreys
 James Tideswell to  Yorkshire Carnegie
 Sonny Parker retired
 Alec Hepburn to  Perth Spirit
 Mike Denbee to  East Grinstead RFC
 Ollie Frost to  East Grinstead RFC
 John Quill to  Dolphin RFC
 Joe Ajuwa released
 Rob Andrew released
 Toby L'Estrange released
 Ian Nimmo released
 Hudson Tonga'uiha released

Newcastle Falcons

Players In
 Juan Pablo Socino from  Rotherham Titans
 Ruki Tipuna from  Bristol Rugby
 Calum Green from  Yorkshire Carnegie
 Rob Hawkins from  Leicester Tigers
 Eric Fry from  London Scottish
 Alesana Tuilagi from  NTT Communications Shining Arcs
 Anitelea Tuilagi from  Newport Gwent Dragons
 Joshua Furno from  Biarritz Olympique
 Uili Kolo'ofai from  US Colomiers
 Kane Thompson from  Chiefs

Players Out
 Chris Pilgrim to  Yorkshire Carnegie
 James Fitzpatrick to  Yorkshire Carnegie
 Michael Tait to  Edinburgh Rugby
 Franck Montanella to  Biarritz Olympique
 Alex Crockett retired
 Joel Hodgson to  Northampton Saints
 Grant Shiells to  Bath Rugby
 Fraser McKenzie to  Edinburgh Rugby
 Harry Spencer to  AS Mâcon

Northampton Saints

Players In
 Alex Day  promoted from Academy
 Joel Hodgson from  Newcastle Falcons
 Jon Fisher from  London Irish

Players Out
 Vasily Artemyev to  Krasny Yar Krasnoyarsk
 Gerrit-Jan van Velze to  Worcester Warriors
 Danny Herriott to  Jersey
 Ryan Glynn to  Jersey
 Paul Diggin retired
 Sam Harry released
 Fa'atoina Autagavaia to  USO Nevers
 Ross McMillan to  Bristol Rugby

Sale Sharks

Players In
 Nathan Hines from  Clermont Auvergne
 Chris Cusiter from  Glasgow Warriors
 Alberto De Marchi from  Benetton Treviso
 Darren Fearn from  Bedford Blues
 Luke McLean from  Benetton Treviso
 Magnus Lund from  Biarritz Olympique
 Shalva Mamukashvili from  RC Army Tbilisi
 Josh Beaumont promoted from Academy
 James Flynn promoted from Academy
 Nathan Fowles promoted from Academy
 Sam James promoted from Academy
 Charlie Ignall promoted from Academy
 Mike Haley promoted from Academy

Players Out
 Henry Thomas to  Bath Rugby
 Dwayne Peel to  Bristol Rugby
 James Gaskell to  Wasps
 Rob Miller to  Wasps
 Tom Holmes to  Rotherham Titans
 Kirill Kulemin to  USA Perpignan
 Tony Buckley retired

Saracens

Players In
 Jim Hamilton from  Montpellier
 Juan Figallo from  Montpellier
 Mike Ellery from  England Sevens
 Kieran Longbottom from  Western Force
 Catalin Fercu from  RC Timişoara

Players Out
 Steve Borthwick retired
 Nick Auterac to  Bath Rugby
 Matt Stevens to  
 Max Crumpton to  Bristol Rugby
 James Short to  London Irish
 Nick Fenton-Wells to  Bedford Blues
 Tom Jubb to  Plymouth Albion
 Joel Tomkins to  Wigan Warriors
 Michael Tagicakibau to  Scarlets
 Eoin Sheriff to  Bedford Blues (season-loan)
 Mouritz Botha to  Sharks
 Jack Wilson to  Sharks

Wasps

Players In
 Bradley Davies from  Cardiff Blues
 James Gaskell from  Sale Sharks
 Rob Miller from  Sale Sharks
 Lorenzo Cittadini from  Benetton Treviso
 Ruaridh Jackson from  Glasgow Warriors
 Alapati Leiua from  Hurricanes
 Ed Shervington from  Worcester Warriors
 Buster Lawrence from  Moseley
 Thomas Young from  Gloucester Rugby
 Alex Lozowski from  Yorkshire Carnegie
 Will Rowlands promoted from Academy
 John Yapp from  Edinburgh Rugby
 Sailosi Tagicakibau from  London Irish

Players Out
 Neil Cochrane to  Edinburgh Rugby
 Hugo Southwell retired
 Tom Palmer to  Gloucester Rugby
 Esteban Lozada retired
 Liam O'Neill to  Nottingham
 Tommy Bell to  Jersey
 Rory Pitman to  Scarlets
 Ricky Reeves to  London Welsh
 Taione Vea to  London Welsh
 Joe Carlisle to  Benetton Treviso
 Charlie Hayter to  England Sevens
 Andrew Suniula to  Old Blue

See also
List of 2014–15 RFU Championship transfers
List of 2014–15 Pro12 transfers
List of 2014–15 Top 14 transfers
List of 2014–15 Super Rugby transfers
List of 2014–15 Aviva Premiership Academy promotions

References

2014-15
2014–15 English Premiership (rugby union)